Brancsikia areoplana is a species of praying mantis from Madagascar, in the family Majangidae.

See also
List of mantis genera and species
Dead leaf mantis

External links
Animal Diversity

Mantidae
Deroplatyinae
Insects described in 1911
Taxa named by Charles Lamberton